Fred Cogley (27 June 1934 – 14 June 2017) was an Irish sports commentator and TV presenter who worked for the Raidió Éireann and later Raidió Teilifís Éireann for 49 years. He covered eleven Summer Olympic Games from 1952 to 1996 and twelve football World Cups, however, Cogley was best known as the "voice of rugby".

Cogley was the grandson of theatre impresario Daisy Bannard Cogley.

References

1934 births
2017 deaths
20th-century Irish people
21st-century Irish people
Irish sports broadcasters
Mass media people from Dublin (city)
RTÉ television presenters